Megachile lippiae is a species of bee in the family Megachilidae. It was described by Theodore Dru Alison Cockerell in 1900.

References

Lippiae
Insects described in 1900